Courtney Boyd Myers is an American entrepreneur. She is known for founding Audience.io, a consulting firm designed to create parity between tech start-ups in New York City and London.

From 2007-2009, Boyd Myers worked for Forbes.com as a technology and opinions reporter. She later worked as the East Coast Editor of The Next Web, covering global technology trends, web startups and Internet entrepreneurs. Boyd Myers created the 3460 miles newsletter, focussing on linking the New York City and London tech start-up scenes. Following this, in 2013 she launched the consulting firm Audience.io to help New York City and London-based technology start-ups grow internationally by providing strategy around media and content, business development, and product management. She is a member of 10 Downing and Tech City’s Advisory Board and a mentor at Seedcamp, Ignite100, and BBCWorldWideLabs. 

Currently, Boyd Myers is the CEO/CMO of AKUA, a company that makes kelp-based meat alternatives. She co-founded the company in 2017, with the goal of producing a more sustainable alternative to traditionally meat-based products. The company now produces kelp alternatives to burgers, jerky, and ground meat.

References

External links 
 
 Huffington Post
 PSFK

American women journalists
Living people
Year of birth missing (living people)
21st-century American women